The 119th New York State Legislature, consisting of the New York State Senate and the New York State Assembly, met from January 1 to April 30, 1896, during the second year of Levi P. Morton's governorship, in Albany.

Background
Under the provisions of the New York Constitution of 1894, 50 Senators and 150 assemblymen were elected in single-seat districts; senators for a two-year term, assemblymen for a one-year term. The senatorial districts were made up of entire counties, except New York County (twelve districts), Kings County (seven districts), Erie County (three districts) and Monroe County (two districts). The Assembly districts were made up of contiguous area, all within the same county.

At this time there were two major political parties: the Republican Party and the Democratic Party. The Prohibition Party, the Socialist Labor Party and the People's Party also nominated tickets.

Elections
The New York state election, 1895 was held on November 5. The state officers and state senators were elected to an exceptional three-year term (for the sessions of 1896, 1897 and 1898), so that the election of these officers would be held, beginning in 1898, in even-numbered years, at the same time as the gubernatorial election.

All six statewide elective offices up for election was carried by the Republicans. The approximate party strength at this election, as expressed by the vote for Secretary of State, was: Republican 601,000; Democratic 511,000; Prohibition 25,000; Socialist Labor 21,000; and People's Party 7,000.

Sessions
The Legislature met for the regular session at the State Capitol in Albany on January 1, 1896; and adjourned on April 30.

Hamilton Fish II (R) was re-elected Speaker.

Timothy E. Ellsworth (R) was elected president pro tempore of the State Senate.

State Senate

Districts

Note: There are now 62 counties in the State of New York. The counties which are not mentioned in this list had not yet been established, or sufficiently organized, the area being included in one or more of the abovementioned counties.

Members
The asterisk (*) denotes members of the previous Legislature who continued in office as members of this Legislature. Richard Higbie, Frank Gallagher, George W. Brush, Albert A. Wray, Julius L. Wieman, Samuel J. Foley, Frank D. Pavey, J. Irving Burns, George R. Malby, Benjamin M. Wilcox, Edwin C. Stewart and Simon Seibert changed from the Assembly to the Senate.

Employees
 Clerk: John S. Kenyon
 Sergeant-at-Arms: Garret J. Benson
 Doorkeeper: Nathan Lewis
 Stenographer: Edward Shaughnessy

State Assembly

Assemblymen

Employees
 Clerk: Archie E. Baxter
Financial Clerk: William C. Stevens
 Sergeant-at-Arms: Philip W. Reinhard, Jr.
 Doorkeeper: Joseph Bauer
 Stenographer: Henry C. Lammert

Notes

Sources
 The New York Red Book compiled by Edgar L. Murlin (published by James B. Lyon, Albany NY, 1897; see senators' bios pg. 133–177; senators' portraits between pg. 136 and 137; pg. 404 for list of senators; pg. 512f for assemblymen; pg. 712–716 for senate districts)
 The Tribune Almanac (1896)

119
1896 in New York (state)
1896 U.S. legislative sessions